The LTSR 37 class was a class of 4-4-2T suburban tank engines built for the London, Tilbury and Southend Railway in 1897–98. They were designed by Thomas Whitelegg as a development of the earlier LT&SR 1 Class.

History
Six locomotives were built by Sharp, Stewart and Company in 1897, with a further six being built by Dübs and Company the following year. The LTSR numbered the locomotives  37–48 and named them after places in Essex, near the LTSR route. After the LTSR was absorbed by the Midland Railway in 1912, they were renumbered 2146–2157 and their names were removed. The Midland gave them the power classification 3P. All passed to the London, Midland and Scottish Railway in 1923 on grouping, and initially carried their MR number in LMS service. However, in 1930 they were renumbered 2135–2146, and in 1947 were to be again renumbered 1953–1964, however none had been by nationalisation, and so they were renumbered by British Railways directly to 41953–41964. They were withdrawn between 1951 and 1952, and none survived into preservation.

Four more locomotives of a similar class, the LT&SR 79 Class, were built in 1909.

Accidents and incidents
On 18 December 1931, a freight train became divided at  station, Essex. Due to a signalman's error, a passenger train hauled by locomotive No. 2139 ran into the rear portion of the freight. Two people were killed and several were injured.

List of locomotives

References

Source

37
4-4-2T locomotives
Sharp Stewart locomotives
Dübs locomotives
Railway locomotives introduced in 1897
Scrapped locomotives